The abbreviation SSFC may refer to, in terms of educational establishments:
Scarborough Sixth Form College, North Yorkshire
Shrewsbury Sixth Form College, Shropshire
Solihull Sixth Form College, West Midlands
Stockton Sixth Form College, Stockton-on-Tees
Sir Sandford Fleming College, Ontario
and in terms of sport, to:
Sagawa Shiga F.C.
Seattle Sounders FC
Shanghai Shenhua F.C.
Sivutsa Stars F.C.
Sony Sugar F.C.
South Shields F.C.
South Sydney Football Club
Southland Spirit FC 
Stourport Swifts F.C.

and also, to:
South Shields Folk Club, South Shields
 Special Security Force Command, a paramilitary law enforcement body in Bahrain